Aw Pi Kyeh also A Pi Kyè  (born 24 July 1959) is a famous cartoonist in Myanmar.

Early life and education 
He was born in 1959 July 24 in the Yenanchaung village, Pakokku District and given the birth name Win Naing. His father is Thaung Sein and his mother is Khin Aye.

In 1982, he graduated with a BE (Mech) from Yangon Technological University and a MPA (Master of Public Administration) from Harvard University in 2001.

Career
In 1981, he started drawing cartoons in magazines. From 1982 to 1988, he worked as a car engineer and rice mill engineer. He has worked as a full-time cartoonist since 4 April 1989. He also occasionally created advertising designs and CDs.

Publications
Aw Pi Kye Cartoons - First Volume (အော်ပီကျယ်ကာတွန်းများ ၁) -1990
Aw Pi Kye Cartoons - Second Volume (အော်ပီကျယ်ကာတွန်းများ ၂) - 1994
Two Sheep (သိုးနှစ်ကောင်) - 1997
Domestic Comics (ပြည်တွင်းဖြစ်ကာတွန်းများ) - 1998
Rates (ဈေးနှုန်းများ) - 1999

References

Living people
Burmese cartoonists
1959 births
Harvard Kennedy School alumni